The Big League World Series (BLWS) Host team was one of six United States "regions" that sent teams to the World Series. The Big League division was discontinued by Little League Baseball after the 2016 BLWS.

Host Teams at the Big League World Series

Results by Host

See also
Host Teams in other Little League divisions
Intermediate League
Junior League
Senior League

References

Big League World Series
Host
Baseball in South Carolina
Pickens County, South Carolina